Lien Fang Yu born 14 April 1943 in Chongqing as Fang Yu, is the wife of Lien Chan, chairman of the Kuomintang party from 2000 to 2005. Fang is a former Miss Republic of China.

Fang and Lien were married in 1965, the same year that Lien received a PhD in political science from the University of Chicago.

References

1943 births
Living people
Chinese beauty pageant winners
Lien Heng family
Writers from Chongqing
Taiwanese women writers
Second ladies of the Republic of China
Taiwanese people from Chongqing